Events from the year 1946 in South Korea.

United States Army Military Government in Korea 
 Military Governor:
 Archer L. Lerch (starting December 1945)
 William F. Dean (starting October 1947)

Events

September
Korean general strike of September 1946

October
1946 South Korean legislative election was held.

October 1-Autumn Uprising of 1946

November
Standing Committee of the Workers' Party of South Korea was elected in November.

See also 
 List of Korean films of 1919–1948

References

Bibliography

 

1946 in South Korea
South Korea
Years of the 20th century in South Korea
1940s in South Korea
South Korea